Andreas Keuser (born 14 April 1974) is a German cyclist riding for .

Major results
2008
5th Overall Tour de la Pharmacie Centrale
2011
1st Overall Tour of Trakya
1st Stage 8 Tour of Romania
2013
7th Tobago Cycling Classic
2016
8th Circuit International d'Alger

References

1974 births
Living people
German male cyclists
People from Paderborn (district)
Sportspeople from Detmold (region)
Cyclists from North Rhine-Westphalia